Steve Arrington's Hall of Fame, Vol.1 is the debut album by Steve Arrington and his band. By 1982, Arrington had been in Slave for almost five years and was ready to go solo. He formed his band simply called "Steve Arrington's Hall of Fame" and went to work on their debut album. Released in 1983, the album reached number 12 on the Top Soul Albums charts in 1983.

Reception

Reviewing the album in Record, Vince Aletti called Steve Arrington's Hall of Fame, Vol. 1 "not just the best funk debut of the year so far, but an album appealing and original enough that even veterans will find it hard to beat." He picked "Nobody Can Be You" as the highlight for its unexpectedly introspective lyrics and tight instrumental production, but said that the entire album is full of fresh songs which eschew funk cliches and benefit from Arrington's unpredictable vocals, commenting that, "Arrington's singing keeps you on edge, alert to its changing coloration, its swift kicks and cool caresses, often delivered when you least expect them."

Track listing
"Nobody Can Be You" - (Steve Arrington, Charles Carter)  5:16
"You Meet My Approval" - (Arrington, C. Carter)  5:30
"Last Nite/Nite Before" - (Arrington, Sam Carter)  4:45
"Strange (Soft & Hard)" - (Arrington)  4:27 	
"Speak With Your Body" - (Arrington, C. Carter)  5:22
"Weak At The Knees" -  (Arrington, Buddy Hankerson, C. Carter, Roger Parker)  5:21
"Beddie-Biey" - (Arrington, Hankerson, Victor Godsey)  4:04
"Way Out" - (Arrington, S. Carter)  4:22

Personnel
Steve Arrington - lead and backing vocals, bass, drums, rhythm guitar, keyboards
Charles Carter - keyboards, saxophone, backing vocals
Bruce Victor Godsey - flute, keyboards, backing vocals
Buddy Hankerson - bass, backing vocals
Roger Parker - drums, backing vocals
Kevin Eubanks - bass, guitar
Gary Jackson - percussion, backing vocals
Arthur Rhaimes - guitar
Sam Carter - keyboards, African calls

Charts

Singles

Samples & covers
N.W.A sampled "Weak At The Knees" on their song "Gangsta Gangsta" on their album Straight Outta Compton in 1988.
Ice Cube sampled "Weak At The Knees" on his song "The Nigga You Love to Hate" on his album AmeriKKKa's Most Wanted in 1990.
A Tribe Called Quest sampled "Beddie-Biey" on their song "The Chase, Part II" on their album Midnight Marauders in 1993.
Shaquille O'Neal sampled "Nobody Can Be You" on his song "Nobody" on his album Shaq Fu: Da Return in 1994. 
Jermaine Dupri & Jay-Z sampled "Weak At The Knees" on their song "Money Ain't a Thang" on their  album Life in 1472 & Vol. 2... Hard Knock Life in 1998.
3 X Dope sampled "Weak At the Knees" on the song Weak At The Knees on their album Live from Acknickulous Land in 1990.

References

External links
 Steve Arrington-Steve Arrington's Hall Of Fame at Discogs

1983 debut albums
Atlantic Records albums